Hurricane Amanda was the strongest Eastern Pacific tropical cyclone ever recorded in the month of May. The first named storm, hurricane and major hurricane of the 2014 Pacific hurricane season, Amanda originated from a tropical wave that had entered the Eastern Pacific on May 16. Slow development occurred as it tracked westward, and development into a tropical depression occurred on May 22. The depression later strengthened into a tropical storm on May 23. Amid very favorable conditions, Amanda then rapidly intensified late on May 23, eventually reaching its peak intensity on May 25 as a high-end Category 4 hurricane. Afterwards, steady weakening occurred due to upwelling beneath the storm, and Amanda fell below major hurricane intensity on May 26. Rapid weakening occurred and the cyclone eventually dissipated on May 29.

The tropical cyclone did not directly impact landmasses, however it had indirect impacts along the coast of Mexico. Heavy rains caused flooding in the towns of Guerrero and Manzanillo, Mexico, resulting in 2 fatalities. A third occurred after a tree fell on a car in Acapulco. Landslides and high surf were also reported along the Mexican coastline, causing minor damage.

Meteorological history 

On May 16, a tropical wave emerged into the Eastern Pacific. The system failed to organize further over the next two days as thunderstorm activity oscillated as it continued to track westward and eventually west-northwestward. By May 22, however, scatterometer data began to indicate that the system was becoming better defined, with deep convection persisting near the center, which was getting better organized. The depression gradually organized, with banding features developing near the center, and eventually was upgraded to a tropical storm on May 23, being assigned the name Amanda.

Steered by a subtropical ridge over central Mexico, Amanda slowly moved westward against the southern periphery of the ridge. With very warm sea surface temperatures of near , a moist environment, and light wind shear, forecasters at the National Hurricane Center predicted that Amanda had the potential to rapidly intensify. Indeed, Amanda then began a period of rapid intensification late on May 23, becoming a hurricane by 15:00 UTC on May 24. Banding features and a central dense overcast (CDO) continued to become better organized, and a pinhole eye was seen to develop in microwave imagery. The small eye of the cyclone continued to quickly clear, and Amanda became a major hurricane by 03:00 UTC on May 25, making it the second-earliest such storm within the National Hurricane Center's area of responsibility, only to be surpassed by Hurricane Bud from 2012. The rapid intensification eventually leveled off with Amanda reaching its peak intensity at 12:00 UTC that day as a high-end Category 4 hurricane on the Saffir–Simpson scale. Winds were estimated at 155 mph (250 km/h) and the minimum pressure at 932 mbar (hPa; 27.52 inHg).

Because Amanda had been moving slowly over nearly the same areas as it had before, the hurricane began upwelling waters from below, with sea surface temperatures dropping by 6 °C underneath it. Amanda maintained its peak intensity for 6 hours before it began to steadily weaken due to the upwelled waters. By May 27, Amanda had fallen below major hurricane intensity, and despite slightly redeveloping its CDO, Amanda continued to rapidly weaken due to dry air, degrading to a tropical storm on May 28. The circulation then became elongated, and Amanda later dissipated the next day.

Impact and records
Under the anticipation of heavy rains and landslides, a "blue" alert was declared for Guerrero. An alert was issued for Manzanillo. Thirty-four shelters opened in Michoacán while 80 opened in Guerrero. Heavy rains occurred in Guerrero, resulting in flooding.

A river near Coyuca de Benítez overflowed its banks. Three trees were brought down and a vehicle in Acapulco was destroyed. Statewide, one person was killed when a tree that had fallen on the road resulted in a fatal car wreck. In Colima, minor landslides occurred, resulting in the closure of Federal Highway 200. Much of Michoacán was battered by large waves and heavy rains, resulting in two casualties. Several roads were destroyed in Zitácuaro.

On May 25, Amanda became the second-earliest East Pacific major hurricane on record, behind 2012's Hurricane Bud. Later that day, it also became the strongest May tropical cyclone in the Eastern Pacific basin in the satellite era, eclipsing the previous record set by Hurricane Adolph in 2001, which had peak winds of 145 mph (230 km/h).

See also

 Timeline of the 2014 Pacific hurricane season
 List of Category 4 Pacific hurricanes

References

External links

The National Hurricane Center's advisory archive of Hurricane Amanda
The National Hurricane Center's graphics archive of Hurricane Amanda

Amanda
Amanda
2014 in Mexico
Amanda
Amanda